Bishop Marko Culej (19 January 1938 – 19 August 2006) was a Croatian Roman Catholic prelate who served as the first Diocesan Bishop of the newly created Roman Catholic Diocese of Varaždin from 5 July 1997 until his death on 19 August 2006. Previously he served as a Titular Bishop of Limata and an Auxiliary Bishop of Archdiocese of Zagreb since 7 January 1992 until 5 July 1997.

Education
Bishop Culej was born into a Croatian Roman Catholic family of Petar and Josipa (née Bočkal) near Zlatar in the Hrvatsko Zagorje region as a one among six their children.

After graduation the primary school in Belac in 1949, he continued the classical gymnasium in the Inter-Diocesan Minor Seminary in Zagreb, he consequently joined the Major Theological Seminary in Zagreb and in the same time the University of Zagreb in 1957. The next year he must interrupted his studies for the compulsory service in the Yugoslavian Army (1958–1959), and returned to his priesthood formation in the seminary, where he studied until 1964, and was ordained as priest on April 24, 1964 for the Archdiocese of Zagreb, after completed his philosophical and theological studies.

Pastoral and educationcal work
After ordination, Fr. Culej in 1964 served as assistant priest in Samobor, and from 1964 as assistant priest in Desinić. In January 1965 he became interim parish administrator for the local St. George church, and in July he was appointed parish administrator and remained there until September 1981, when he was relieved of his duties as parish administrator. From 1965 until 1975, he was also the temporary administrator in Poljana Sutlanska.

In September 1981, he was appointed a Vice-rector of the Archbishop's Major Theological Seminary, a position he held until 1992. In 1986, in addition to the position of Vice-rector, Fr. Culej was appointed a canon of the Primate's Chapter of Zagreb and a head of the Archdiocesan Center for Spiritual Vocations. During 1992–1993 he served as a Rector of the Archbishop's Major Theological Seminary in Zagreb.

Prelate
On January 7, 1992, he was appointed by Pope John Paul II as a Titular Bishop of Limata and an Auxiliary Bishop of the Archdiocese of Zagreb. On February 22, 1992, he was consecrated as bishop by Cardinal Franjo Kuharić and other prelates of the Roman Catholic Church in the Cathedral of Assumption of Blessed Virgin Mary and St. Stephen of Hungary in Zagreb. On August 18, 1993, he was relieved of his duties as the Rector of the Theological Seminary and appointed a Vicar General of the Archdiocese.

A four years later, on July 5, 1997, Mons. Culej become the first Diocesan Bishop of the newly created Roman Catholic Diocese of Varaždin. He died, while at the office, on August 19, 2006 after a long and severe illness at the age of 69 in Varaždin.

References

1938 births
2006 deaths
People from Krapina-Zagorje County
University of Zagreb alumni
Academic staff of the University of Zagreb
20th-century Roman Catholic bishops in Croatia
21st-century Roman Catholic bishops in Croatia
Bishops appointed by Pope John Paul II